Marie Stiborová (2 February 1950 – 13 February 2020) was a Czech university lecturer, politician, and a member of the Czech National Council and Chamber of Deputies. She was also the candidate for the Communist Party (KSČM) in the 1993 presidential election. She later became the leader of the reformist wing within KSČM and established the Left Bloc.

Biography
Stiborová was born in 1950. She studied Chemistry at Charles University and became a lecturer at the university. She joined the Communist Party in 1976 and became a member of Parliament in 1986. The Communist Party nominated her for the president of the Czech Republic in 1993. She lost to Václav Havel.

Stiborová left the Communist Party in 1993 and established Left Bloc. She left politics in 1997.

References

1950 births
2020 deaths
Politicians from Prague
Candidates in the 1993 Czech presidential election
Members of the Chamber of Deputies of the Czech Republic (1992–1996)
Communist Party of Bohemia and Moravia MPs
Communist Party of Bohemia and Moravia presidential candidates
Female candidates for President of the Czech Republic
Charles University alumni
Communist Party of Czechoslovakia politicians
Members of the Chamber of the Nations of Czechoslovakia (1986–1990)
Members of the Chamber of the Nations of Czechoslovakia (1990–1992)